Gaspar Campos-Ansó Fernández (born 27 March 2000) is a Spanish footballer who plays as a midfielder for Burgos CF, on loan from Sporting de Gijón.

Club career
Campos was born in Gijón, Asturias, and joined Sporting de Gijón's Mareo in 2008, aged eight. He made his senior debut with the reserves on 10 March 2019, coming on as a late substitute in a 0–3 Segunda División B away loss against Racing de Santander.

Definitely promoted to the B-team for the 2019–20 campaign, Campos scored his first senior goal on 1 December 2019, netting the equalizer in a 2–1 home win against Las Rozas CF. He made his first team debut the following 25 June, starting in a 1–1 draw at Rayo Vallecano in the Segunda División championship.

Campos started to feature regularly for the main squad in the 2020–21 season, and scored his first professional goals on 25 November 2020, netting a brace in a 3–1 home win against CE Sabadell FC. On 18 August 2022, he was loaned to fellow second division side Burgos CF, for one year.

Personal life
Campos' grandfather Juan Manuel was a senator for Asturias during the 2000–2004 period.

References

External links
 
 
 

2000 births
Living people
Footballers from Gijón
Spanish footballers
Association football midfielders
Segunda División players
Segunda División B players
Sporting de Gijón B players
Sporting de Gijón players
Burgos CF footballers
Spain under-21 international footballers